Centre for Cultural Renewal is a non-partisan Canadian think-tank focused on the relevance of religion within society. It was founded in 1994.

Originally named the Centre for Renewal in Public Policy, the foundation is based in Ottawa, Ontario, and supported by a number of notable Canadian scholars and practitioners in medicine, law, education and politics.

The Centre, which is non-denominational, has often been cited by Parliamentary Committees and, on occasion, by the courts.

It has co-sponsored conferences with Simon Fraser University, the University of British Columbia and the Faculty of Religious Studies at McGill University

In 2010, the Centre was incorporated into Cardus, a public policy think tank based in Hamilton, Ontario.

Notable members
Iain Benson, executive director 2000–2009

References

Centre for Cultural Renewal
Cardus Centre for Cultural Renewal
This national research institute was founded in 1997
Peter Stockland, Senior Fellow at Cardus
 Alan Hustak, contributor
David Kim, contributor
David Peck, contributor
 Greg Paul,  contributor
Petra Bosma, contributor
David Koyzis, contributor

Think tanks based in Canada